is a passenger railway station located in the city of Fujimi, Saitama, Japan, operated by the private railway operator Tōbu Railway. Despite the name, it is not in the city of Fujimino.

Lines
All services except "Rapid express" services stop at this station.

Station layout

The station consists of two island platforms serving four tracks, with an elevated station building located over the platforms. Platforms 1 and 4 are generally used by slower stopping trains overtaken by faster limited-stop trains.

Platforms

History

The station opened on 15 November 1993.

Through-running to and from  via the Tokyo Metro Fukutoshin Line commenced on 14 June 2008.

From 17 March 2012, station numbering was introduced on the Tōbu Tōjō Line, with Fujimino Station becoming "TJ-18".

Passenger statistics
In fiscal 2019, the station was used by an average of 66,843 passengers daily. The passenger figures for previous years are as shown below.

Surrounding area

 Bunkyo Gakuin University Fujimino Campus
 Soyoca Fujimino Shopping Centre (formerly Outlet Mall Rism, Japan's first outlet shopping mall)
 Lalaport Fujimi shopping mall
 I'm Fujimino (high-rise condominium)

Schools
 Oi Higashi Junior High School
 Oi Junior High School
 Fujimino Elementary School
 Oi Elementary School
 Kamekubo Elementary School

Bus services
Since 17 July 2008, there is a direct express bus service to/from Narita Airport (via Shiki and Asakadai Stations). The bus stop is on the west side of the station.

There is a regular bus service to/from Lalaport Fujimi. The bus stop is on the east side of the station. There is a regular bus service to/from Tsuruse Station and Kamifukuoka Station. The bus stop is on the west side of the station.

See also
 List of railway stations in Japan

References

External links

  

Tobu Tojo Main Line
Stations of Tobu Railway
Railway stations in Saitama Prefecture
Railway stations in Japan opened in 1993
Fujimi, Saitama